Calliopius laeviusculus is a species of amphipod in the family Calliopiidae. It is found in Europe and North America.

References

External links

 

Amphipoda
Articles created by Qbugbot
Crustaceans described in 1838